Renato Andrés Ramos Madariaga (born 12 February 1979), nicknamed Tiburón (Shark), is a Chilean football manager and former footballer.

Club career

Early career
Ramos began his career in Chile with Everton de Viña del Mar, at that time of Primera B. He then left Everton and joined Unión Española of the first division of his country. He played two seasons in that team, all in the first division.

Ramos then was followed by Universidad de Concepción in 2003, in where was a frequently player in the starting lineup, which allowed him return to Everton. In his return, his greatest achievement was put end to José María Buljubasich's record of 1,352 minutes without conceding a goal. In 2006, he was signed by Deportes Antofagasta, in where was goalscorer of the team.

In December 2006, was confirmed that Ramos was transferred to the filial of the Mexican team UAG Tecos, Tecos B of the second division of that country. In the second semester, he was named captain of the team and scored 11 goals during the season.

Audax Italiano
On 11 January 2008, was reported that Audax Italiano have signed the striker for an undisclosed fee. Ramos made his debut in the opening match of the 2008 Clausura tournament against Deportes La Serena in a 0–0 draw. On 7 February, the player made his first appearance for Copa Libertadores in his career against Boyacá Chicó. He scored his first goal at his club's fourth appearance in a 4–1 win over Huachipato.

After one month without play, on 10 April 2008, Ramos scored an historic goal at the 78th minute of game against São Paulo, that ended in a 1–0 win thanks for to him. After of this goal, the player took hold in the first team.

Bolívar
On 10 July 2008, Ramos signed for the Bolivian side Bolívar in a three-year contract. His first goal in the first division of that country was on his debut against San José in the first week of the season. Their first international goals for the club were against LDU Quito at the Copa Sudamericana's first round, being the second fastest goal of that tournament in a 2–1 home win.

After the club's elimination at Copa Sudamericana, Ramos started to make an offensive duo in the attack with his teammate Joaquín Botero. In the 2008 Bolivian tournament semifinals, Ramos' fifth and decisive penalty was stopped by the keeper of Real Potosí, ultimately resulting in Potosí advancing to the finals. Shortly after, he was released of the club.

Ñublense
On 21 December 2008, Ramos signed for Chilean side Ñublense a one-year contract.

Universidad de Concepción
On 2 June 2010, Ramos was released of Ñublense, and returned to Universidad de Concepción, team in where he already played in 2003. His new club, paid US$30.000 for the 25% of the striker's rights.

Managerial career
On 2017, he began his managerial career as manager of Palestino at under-11 level, becoming Director of Football of the all youth levels from 2019 to 2021. At the same time, he has performed as a teacher at the Instituto Nacional del Fútbol (Football National Institute of Chile).

On 2021, he became manager of Chilean Segunda División side Deportes Concepción.

Club statistics

References

External links
 
 Renato Ramos at Football Lineups
 
 
 
 
 

1979 births
Living people
People from Antofagasta
People from Antofagasta Province
People from Antofagasta Region
Chilean footballers
Chilean Primera División players
Ascenso MX players
Bolivian Primera División players
Primera B de Chile players
Unión Española footballers
Universidad de Concepción footballers
Everton de Viña del Mar footballers
C.D. Antofagasta footballers
Tecos F.C. footballers
Audax Italiano footballers
Club Bolívar players
Ñublense footballers
San Marcos de Arica footballers
Lota Schwager footballers
Club Deportivo Palestino footballers
A.C. Barnechea footballers
Chilean expatriate footballers
Chilean expatriate sportspeople
Chilean expatriate sportspeople in Mexico
Chilean expatriates in Mexico
Chilean expatriate sportspeople in Bolivia
Chilean expatriates in Bolivia
Expatriate footballers in Mexico
Expatriate footballers in Bolivia
Association football forwards
Chilean football managers
Deportes Concepción (Chile) managers